Pinhão may refer to:

Places

Brazil
 Pinhão, Sergipe, a municipality in the State of Sergipe
 Pinhão, Paraná, a municipality in the state of Paraná 
 Pinhão River, river in southern Brazil

Portugal
 Pinhão (Alijó), a civil parish in the municipality of Alijó

Other
 Pinhão is a type of pine nut, the seed of Araucaria angustifolia